The 2005 PGA Tour season was played from January 6 to November 6.

Schedule
The following table lists official events during the 2006 season.

Unofficial events
The following events were sanctioned by the PGA Tour, but did not carry official money, nor were wins official.

Location of tournaments

Money leaders
The money list was based on prize money won during the season, calculated in U.S. dollars.

Awards

See also
2005 in golf

Notes

References

External links
2005 schedule at pgatour.com
 2005 PGA Tour at ESPN

PGA Tour seasons
PGA Tour